In Galois cohomology, local Tate duality (or simply local duality) is a duality for Galois modules for the absolute Galois group of a non-archimedean local field. It is named after John Tate who first proved it. It shows that the dual of such a Galois module is the Tate twist of usual linear dual. This new dual is called the (local) Tate dual.

Local duality combined with Tate's local Euler characteristic formula provide a versatile set of tools for computing the Galois cohomology of local fields.

Statement
Let K be a non-archimedean local field, let Ks denote a separable closure of K, and let GK = Gal(Ks/K) be the absolute Galois group of K.

Case of finite modules
Denote by μ the Galois module of all roots of unity in Ks. Given a finite GK-module A of order prime to the characteristic of K, the Tate dual of A is defined as

(i.e. it is the Tate twist of the usual dual A∗). Let Hi(K, A) denote the group cohomology of GK with coefficients in A. The theorem states that the pairing

given by the cup product sets up a duality between Hi(K, A) and H2−i(K, A′) for i = 0, 1, 2. Since GK has cohomological dimension equal to two, the higher cohomology groups vanish.

Case of p-adic representations
Let p be a prime number. Let Qp(1) denote the p-adic cyclotomic character of GK (i.e. the Tate module of μ). A p-adic representation of GK is a continuous representation

where V is a finite-dimensional vector space over the p-adic numbers Qp and GL(V) denotes the group of invertible linear maps from V to itself. The Tate dual of V is defined as

(i.e. it is the Tate twist of the usual dual V∗ = Hom(V, Qp)). In this case, Hi(K, V) denotes the continuous group cohomology of GK with coefficients in V. Local Tate duality applied to V says that the cup product induces a pairing

which is a duality between Hi(K, V) and H2−i(K, V ′) for i = 0, 1, 2. Again, the higher cohomology groups vanish.

See also
Tate duality, a global version (i.e. for global fields)

Notes

References
 
 , translation of  Cohomologie Galoisienne, Springer-Verlag Lecture Notes 5 (1964).

Theorems in algebraic number theory
Galois theory
Duality theories